Triple Dog is a 2010 Canadian drama thriller film directed by Pascal Franchot and written by Barbara Marshall. The film stars Britt Robertson, Alexia Fast, Scout Taylor-Compton, and Janel Parrish. It was released by Gravitas Ventures in the United States and Canada on September 21, 2010.

Plot
At a sweet sixteen sleepover, new student Chapin Wright bullies the group of girls into playing a game of dares. As the night progresses, Chapin escalates the dares, with no regard for the consequences. While things get hectic, the girls slowly unravel the truth behind Chapin's secret past; she was in a group bullied by Stacy St. Clair into similarly demeaning dares at her previous school, ending with Stacy drowning when a drunk and bitter Chapin dared her to jump off a bridge over a rapidly moving stream.

Cast

In addition, Julia Maxwell appears, in numerous flashbacks, as drowning victim Stacy St. Clair.

References

External links
 
 

2010 films
2010 thriller drama films
2010s Canadian films
2010s English-language films
2010s teen drama films
Canadian teen drama films
Canadian thriller drama films
English-language Canadian films
Films about games
Films shot in Vancouver
Teen thriller films